Hjortshøj  is a surname of Danish origin. 

People bearing the name Hjortshøj include:
Anne Mette Hjortshøj,  Danish studio potter 
Lars Hjortshøj (born 1967), Danish comedian and television and radio host
 (born 1942), Danish journalist, TV host and producer
Majbritt Hjortshøj (born 1976), Danish sports shooter

Danish-language surnames